Fall streaks may refer to:

 Praecipitatio, a visual appearance of precipitation reaching the ground
 Virga, a visual appearance of precipitation which doesn't reach the ground
 Fallstreak hole, a large circular gap that can appear in cirrocumulus or altocumulus clouds